A writ for the election of the 9th General Assembly of Nova Scotia was issued 29 May 1806, returnable 7 Aug. 1806. It convened on 18 November 1806 and held seven sessions. It was dissolved on 14 August 1811.

The Assembly sat at the pleasure of Lieutenant Governor Sir John Wentworth until 1808, Lieutenant Governor Sir Sir George Prevost to 1811, and Alexander Croke in 1811.

William Cottnam Tonge was chosen Speaker but the Lieutenant Governor did not approve.  Lewis Morris Wilkins was then chosen Speaker 20 Nov. 1806.

Division of Seats
Amherst Township
Edward Baker
Annapolis County
Thomas Ritchie
Henry Rutherford -took seat 10 Dec. 1806, died 21 Feb. 1807.
Phineas Lovett, Jr. -by-election 11 May 1808, took seat 30 May 1808.
Annapolis Township
Thomas Walker -seat declared vacant 11 Dec. 1806 for undue influence.  Lt. Gov. refused to issue the writ for by-election, case referred to home government. Response commanding writ be issued received 3 March 1808, when the house was in recess.  Communicated to the House 25 May 1808.
William Robertson -by-election, took seat 20 May 1808.
Barrington Township
John Sargent -took seat 20 May 1808.
Cornwallis Township
Lemuel Morton -took seat 18 Nov. 1806, died 30 April 1811.
Cumberland County
Henry Purdy
Thomas Roach
Digby Township
John Warwick
Falmouth Township
Jeremiah Northup -died in 1809
William Henry Shey -by-election 31 May 1809, took seat 8 June 1809.
Granville Township
Isaiah Shaw
Halifax County
Edward Mortimer
Simon Bradstreet Robie -took seat 3 Dec. 1807.
Samuel George William Archibald
William Lawson
Halifax Township
John George Pyke
Foster Hutchinson, Jr. -took seat 18 Nov. 1806, seat declared vacant 2 Apr. 1811, appointed assistant justice of the Supreme Court
Hants County
William Cottnam Tonge -seat declared vacant 2 Apr. 1811 for non-attendance.
Shubael Dimock
Horton Township
Daniel DeWolf
Kings County
Jonathan Crane
John Wells
Liverpool Township
Joseph Barss -took seat May 20, 1808.
Londonderry Township
Samuel Chandler
Lunenburg County
Lewis Morris Wilkins
Edward James
Lunenburg Township
John Bolman -seat declared vacant 22 Dec. 1809 for non-attendance 
John Creighton, Jr. -by-election, 30 Mar. 1810, may not have taken seat.
Newport Township
Thomas Allen
Onslow Township
Nathaniel Marsters
Queens County
Snow Parker
George Collins
Shelburne County
Jacob Van Buskirk
James Lent -took seat 3 Dec. 1807.
Shelburne Township
Colin Campbell -took seat 20 May 1808.
Sydney County
Joseph Marshall -took seat 22 Nov. 1806.
Edward Irish -died
William Allen Chipman -by-election, took seat 18 Dec. 1807, seat declared vacant 4 Jan. 1808 due to invalid election.
John Cunningham - -by-election 9 May 1808, took seat 24 Nov. 1808.
Truro Township
Thomas Pearson
Windsor Township
William Hersey Otis Haliburton
Yarmouth Township
Samuel Sheldon Poole -took seat 27 Nov. 1806.

References
David Allison; "History of Nova Scotia", Bowen, Halifax, 1916. 
Journal and proceedings of the House of Assembly, 1806 (1807)

09
1806 in Canada
1807 in Canada
1808 in Canada
1809 in Canada
1810 in Canada
1811 in Canada
1806 establishments in Nova Scotia
1811 disestablishments in Nova Scotia